Carlos Cabezas, Spanish basquetballer.

Carlos Cabezas may also refer to:

Carlos Cabezas (Electrodomésticos), Chilean musician, leader of Electrodomésticos
Carlos Cabezas (Los Jaivas), Chilean musician, singer and multi-instrumentalist of Los Jaivas